Surya is a 2008 Tamil language film, written and directed by stunt master Jaguar Thangam, in his directorial debut. The film stars his son debutant Vijaya Chiranjeevi and Keerthi Chawla. The film received negative reviews from critics. This Movie Was Dubbed In Hindi As Surakshaa - One Challenger Hero And It Was Distributed By Shemaroo Entertainment.

Cast 
Vijaya Chiranjeevi
Keerthi Chawla
 Neepa
Mayilsamy

Production
The film marked the acting debut of Vijaya Chiranjeevi, son of stunt master Jaguar Thangam who also made directorial debut with this film.

Soundtrack
Soundtrack was composed by Jerome Pushparaj.
"Veeradhi Veeranada" — Tippu
"Vettaiyaada Vaada" — Girish, Vinaya
"Sammadhama" — Shalini, Karthi
"Padaiyedu" — Tippu, Mervin
"Theme Music"

Reception 
A critic from Behindwoods gave the film zero out of five stars.

References

External links
 Suryaa - Tamil Movie at Nanbargal.Com

Films set in Chennai
2008 films
2000s Tamil-language films
Films shot in Chennai
Indian action films
2008 action films